2018 AH is a sub-kilometer asteroid, classified as near-Earth object of the Apollo group, approximately  in diameter. It was first observed on 4 January 2018, by the Asteroid Terrestrial-impact Last Alert System (ATLAS) on Mauna Loa and quickly followed-up by many other surveys, with precovery observations found from Pan-STARRS and PTF from the day previous.

It is the largest known asteroid to pass so close to Earth since  in 1971, and until  in 2028, although it was only discovered two days after its closest approach on 2 January 2018, at 04:25 UTC. The Tunguska asteroid was likely of a similar size, if not slightly smaller.

Before being recovered on 4 January 2022 11:49 UTC at an Earth distance of 9.8 million km, the asteroid only had an observation arc of 46 days and had not been observed since February 2018. Being a short arc object that had not been observed for years generated an uncertainty that is relatively large. Between 24-31 December 2021 it was only known to make an Earth approach of between 1-8 million km. As it came to perihelion on 3 December 2021, it was approaching from the direction of the Sun.

Description 

 has a fairly eccentric orbit, and its distance to the Sun therefore varies from as close as 90% of the Sun-Earth distance to over 4 times that distance. Due to this, among other factors, the asteroid remained undiscovered until its 2018 approach. It is almost always dimmer than magnitude 23, dimmer than most asteroid surveys can detect. During August-October 2013 it approached within ~0.3 AU of Earth and became as bright as magnitude 22.4, still rather dimmer than most survey-discovered asteroids, and it was not noticed.

2018 Approach 

On its approach to Earth in 2018,  had recently passed perihelion and was moving outwards on its orbit. It therefore approached from roughly the direction of the Sun, where it was undetectable to ground-based optical observations. It reached its closest point to Earth at only 45 degrees from the Sun. It was discovered at a more observable elongation of 129 degrees and at a magnitude of 15.7, and was quickly followed up over the next several days due to its brightness.  remained brighter than magnitude 23 until late February 2018, and will now be mostly unobservable again until its next Earth approach in December 2021.

 passed unusually close for such a bright asteroid, at an absolute magnitude of 22.5 (making it approximately 84–190 meters across). The largest asteroid to pass so close to Earth in 2017 was only an absolute magnitude of 24.3 (or about 31–91 meters). Since 1900, the only asteroids larger than  known to pass closer than it to Earth are listed below:

Asteroid diameters marked in italics have had their size directly measured.

See also 
  – Short arc object (not recently observed) approaching in January 2022
  – Short arc object (not recently observed) possibly approaching in May 2022
 List of asteroid close approaches to Earth in 2018

References

External links 
 MPEC 2018-A23 : 2018 AH, Minor Planet Electronic Circular, 6 January 2018
 Tweet about asteroid 2018 AH, Minor Planet Center
 
 

Minor planet object articles (unnumbered)
Discoveries by ATLAS
20180102
20211227
20180104